The 1967 Connecticut Huskies football team represented the University of Connecticut in the 1967 NCAA College Division football season.  The Huskies were led by second year head coach John Toner, and completed the season with a record of 5–4.

Schedule

References

Connecticut
UConn Huskies football seasons
Connecticut Huskies football